The 2010 Maryland Terrapins football team represented the University of Maryland in the 2010 NCAA Division I FBS football season. It was the Terrapins' (also officially known as the "Terps") 58th season as a member of the Atlantic Coast Conference (ACC) and its sixth within the ACC's Atlantic Division. They played their home games at  Byrd Stadium and were led by head coach Ralph Friedgen. Maryland finished the season 9–4 overall and 5–3 in ACC play. The Terrapins were invited to the Military Bowl, where they defeated East Carolina, 51–20.

Friedgen was fired at the end of the season. He was replaced on January 2, 2011 by Randy Edsall, who was the head coach at Connecticut for the previous 12 seasons (1999–2010).

Schedule

Before the season
The season prior, Maryland finished with a 2–10 (ACC 1–7) record, the worst in head coach Ralph Friedgen's tenure and the first ten-loss season in school history. Despite rumors to the contrary, Friedgen was retained, but then athletic director Deborah Yow stated the expectation was seven wins in the 2010 season.

Key losses
From the already inconsistent offensive line, Maryland lost left tackle Bruce Campbell and center Phil Costa. The 6-foot 7-inch, 310-pound Campbell elected to enter the NFL Draft a year early, and was selected in the fourth round by the Oakland Raiders. Backfield bulwark fullback Cory Jackson was lost to graduation, as was former starting quarterback Chris Turner. Other starters whose eligibility was exhausted were defensive tackle Travis Ivey, defensive ends Jared Harrell and Deege Galt, cornerback Anthony Wiseman, and safeties Jamari McCullough and Terrell Skinner.

Key returns
Maryland's offensive unit returned seven starters. Jamarr Robinson, the only returning quarterback with game experience, entered the season as the starter as expected. In 2009, he filled in for an injured Turner and completed 46 of 85 pass attempts for 459 yards, two touchdowns, and no interceptions. Former 1,000-yard rusher Da'Rel Scott amassed 425 yards and four touchdowns on 85 carries but sat out much of the 2009 season with a broken wrist. Davin Meggett also returned alongside Scott to split touches as the number-one running back. Torrey Smith returned as the leading wide receiver and a strong team leader. The offensive line's loss of Costa was replaced with former walk-on Paul Pinegar. The defensive unit returned five starters, including returning tackle (131) leader linebacker Alex Wujciak, returning sack (6) leader Adrian Moten, and interception (4) leader Cameron Chism.

Recruiting

Personnel

Depth chart

Game summaries

Navy

    
    
    
    
    

Maryland and Navy renewed their intrastate rivalry for their second meeting in 45 years at M&T Bank Stadium in Baltimore. The Terrapins took a 14–0 first quarter lead before the Midshipmen equalized in the second half. Maryland punter Travis Baltz made good a final period field goal, which proved the margin of victory after a goal-line stop by Kenny Tate halted a Navy drive in the closing minutes. Navy gained 412 rushing yards, but the Maryland defense allowed them to convert only two of seven scoring opportunities in the red zone.

Morgan State
In Maryland's home opener they faced Division I FCS  of Baltimore in their first ever meeting. Maryland routed Morgan State, 62–3. The Terrapins held their opponent to 85 yards of offense, the smallest number during Friedgen's tenure as head coach. It featured the most points scored by a Maryland team since the 1975 game against Virginia, and the second-largest margin in the Ralph Friedgen era (after the 61–0 shutout of The Citadel in 2003).

West Virginia
Maryland started the game against West Virginia with four crowd noise-induced penalties that pushed them back against their own end zone. The Mountaineers took a 28–0 lead in the third quarter, but the Terrapins responded with 17 unanswered points. The Maryland passing attack exploited the absence of West Virginia cornerback Brandon Hogan who had been suspended for a drunk driving charge. Quarterback Jamarr Robinson completed long touchdown passes of 60 and 80 yards to Torrey Smith, who dropped a third would-be score in the end zone. Offensive lineman Justin Gilbert suffered a knee injury, and the Maryland line surrendered eight sacks, including one which re-injured backup quarterback Danny O'Brien's ankle in his only snap of the game. It was the most allowed by the offensive line during Friedgen's tenure.

FIU
Redshirt freshman Danny O'Brien started as quarterback in place of Jamarr Robinson, who had a sore throwing arm from the West Virginia game. In the first three possessions, O'Brien managed only one first down, and Maryland fell behind, 7–0. The quarterback then connected with Torrey Smith for a 32-yard pass, which was advanced to the Florida International 9-yard line because of a ten-yard facemask penalty. On the next play, O'Brien floated a pass to LaQuan Williams in the back corner of the end zone, and the point after touchdown equalized the score. In the second quarter, Tony Logan returned a punt 85 yards for a touchdown, which put Maryland up 14–7 at halftime. It was the first time Maryland scored on a punt return since Steve Suter did so in the 2004 Gator Bowl. After Florida International equalized, Da'Rel Scott scored on a 56-yard rush with 2:46 left in the first half. In the third quarter, Florida International scored again before Maryland retook the lead with a 68-yard pass from O'Brien to Smith. Both teams scored once more, and with four minutes remaining in the game, Davin Meggett ran for a 76-yard touchdown. It was the first time Maryland had two 50-yard touchdown runs since Bruce Perry accomplished that feat in 2001.

Duke
In the ACC season opener, Maryland was outgained for the fourth time of the season yet again escaped with a victory. The Terrapins surrendered no turnovers while taking away two from Duke, on two interceptions by safety Antwine Perez and linebacker Adrian Moten. Maryland held Duke to field goals in its first three possessions, and fell behind 9–0. Davin Meggett scored on a 9-yard run to cap a Maryland drive shortly before half time. In the third quarter, Tony Logan returned a punt 85 yards which helped the Terrapins a 14–9 advantage. In the final period, Da'Rel Scott caught a short pass from Danny O'Brien and broke free for a 71-yard touchdown. Duke scored to cut the margin to 21–16, and drove to the Maryland 38-yard line. Antwine Perez broke up a pass from quarterback Sean Renfree, which gave Maryland possession on downs and allowed them to run out the clock.

Clemson

Boston College

Wake Forest

Miami (FL)

Virginia

Florida State

NC State

East Carolina

Awards
Ralph Friedgen, ACC Coach of the Year
Danny O'Brien, QB, ACC Rookie of the Year, Freshman All-America team

All-conference
Torrey Smith, WR, All-ACC first team
Tony Logan, SP, All-ACC first team
Kenny Tate, S, All-ACC first team
Alex Wujciak, LB, All-ACC first team
Joe Vellano, DT, All-ACC second team
Paul Pinegar, OT, All-ACC honorable mention

Players of the week
Danny O'Brien, QB, ACC Rookie of the Week, September 27, 2010
Danny O'Brien, QB, ACC Rookie of the Week, October 25, 2010
Danny O'Brien, QB, ACC Rookie of the Week, November 1, 2010
Danny O'Brien, QB, ACC Rookie of the Week, November 15, 2010
Danny O'Brien, QB, ACC Rookie of the Week, November 29, 2010
Antwine Perez, DB, Jim Thorpe Defensive Back of the Week, October 27, 2010
Antwine Perez, DB, ACC Defensive Back of the Week, October 25, 2010
Antwine Perez, DB, ACC Defensive Back of the Week, November 29, 2010
Torrey Smith, WR, ACC Offensive Back of the Week, November 29, 2010
Kenny Tate, DB, FWAA Nagurski National Defensive Player of the Week, September 4, 2010
Kenny Tate, DB, Jim Thorpe Defensive Back of the Week, September 9, 2010
Kenny Tate, DB, ACC Defensive Back of the Week, September 4, 2010
Joe Vellano, DT, ACC Defensive Lineman of the Week, September 4, 2010

Watch lists
Travis Baltz, P/K, William V. Campbell Trophy semifinalist
Adrian Moten, LB, Butkus Award Watch List
Da'Rel Scott, RB, Doak Walker Award Watch List
Da'Rel Scott, RB, Maxwell Award Watch List
Torrey Smith, WR, Biletnikoff Award Watch List
Torrey Smith, WR, Paul Hornung Award Watch List
Kenny Tate, FS, Bronko Nagurski Trophy Watch List
Alex Wujciak, LB, Bronko Nagurski Trophy Watch List
Alex Wujciak, LB, Butkus Award Watch List
Alex Wujciak, LB, Chuck Bednarik Award Watch List
Alex Wujciak, LB, Lombardi Award Watch List
Alex Wujciak, LB, Lott Trophy Watch List
Torrey Smith, Preseason All-ACC team specialist
Torrey Smith, Preseason All-ACC team wide receiver
Alex Wujciak, Preseason All-ACC team linebacker
Tony Logan, PR, Phil Steele's Midseason All-ACC first team
Adrian Moten, LB, Phil Steele's Midseason All-ACC second team
Torrey Smith, WR, Phil Steele's Midseason All-ACC first team
Kenny Tate, S, Phil Steele's Midseason All-ACC second team
Joe Vellano, DT, Phil Steele's Midseason All-ACC first team
Alex Wujciak, LB, Phil Steele's Midseason All-ACC first team

References

External links

Maryland
Maryland Terrapins football seasons
Military Bowl champion seasons
Maryland Terrapins football